Virginia Village is a neighborhood of Denver, Colorado, roughly five miles southeast of downtown.  The neighborhood is bounded on the west by Colorado Boulevard, one of Denver's busiest thoroughfares, on the southwest by Interstate 25 and on the northeast by Cherry Creek. The neighborhood consists of a mixture of town homes, single-family homes, shopping plazas, and mid to high-rise apartment and office buildings. It is served by the Colorado Station on the E, F, and H RTD light rail lines.

References

Neighborhoods in Denver